Love from a Stranger is the name of two live BBC Television plays directed by George More O'Ferrall. The plays are based on the 1936 stage play of the same name by Frank Vosper. In turn, the play was based on the short story "Philomel Cottage", written by Agatha Christie.

The plays were only broadcast in the London area as this was the only part of the UK that could receive television transmissions at this time; recordings do not exist.

The 1947 version of the Vosper's play was transmitted on Sunday, 25 May 1947, just as the first, live from Alexandra Palace, at 8.45pm in a 75-minute broadcast. The performers in this version were Joy Harington and Henry Oscar. The play was broadcast again two days later when the cast and crew repeated their Sunday performance at 3.00pm on Tuesday, 27 May. Three days later BBC Radio broadcast Three Blind Mice which was later turned into a short story and in 1952 opened as The Mousetrap, the longest-running play in stage history.

Main Cast

 Joy Harington played Cecily Harrington
 Henry Oscar played Bruce Lovell
 Arthur Wontner played Dr Gribble
 Elizabeth Kirkby played Mavis Wilson
 William Roderick played Nigel Lawrence
 Edna Morris played Louise Garrard
 Sam Lysons played Hodgson, the gardener

See also 
 Love from a Stranger (1938 TV play)

External links 
 BFI | Film & TV Database | LOVE FROM A STRANGER (1947) British Film Institute entry for 1947 transmission
 

British plays
1947 plays
BBC television dramas
Plays based on other plays
Plays based on short fiction
Television shows based on works by Agatha Christie
Television articles with incorrect naming style